Wee Pine Knot is a historic house at 319 Spring Street in Sulphur Springs, Benton County, Arkansas. It is a single-story wood-frame structure, finished in peeled-log and half-timbered siding.  The house, and an accompanying garage finished with log siding, were built in 1918-19 by Warren Prickett as a summer house. Its front porch is built out of stacked rock, including its support piers and a half-wall, and the same material is used at the base of the chimney. The interior of the house features Craftsman style woodwork and pine flooring. It is a distinctive local example of Craftsman and Rustic style architecture.

The house was listed on the National Register of Historic Places in 1999.

See also
National Register of Historic Places listings in Benton County, Arkansas

References

Houses on the National Register of Historic Places in Arkansas
Houses completed in 1919
Houses in Benton County, Arkansas
National Register of Historic Places in Benton County, Arkansas
1919 establishments in Arkansas
Rustic architecture in Arkansas
Bungalow architecture in Arkansas
American Craftsman architecture in Arkansas